Saint-Laurent-Médoc (also known as Saint-Laurent-du-Médoc) is a commune in the Gironde department in Nouvelle-Aquitaine in southwestern France.

Population

See also
Communes of the Gironde department
 Haut-Médoc AOC

References

Communes of Gironde